Toomas Hendrik Ilves (born 26 December 1953) is an Estonian politician who served as the fourth president of Estonia from 2006 until 2016.

Ilves worked as a diplomat and journalist, and he was the leader of the Social Democratic Party in the 1990s. He served in the government as Minister of Foreign Affairs from 1996 to 1998 and again from 1999 to 2002. Later, he was a Member of the European Parliament from 2004 to 2006. He was elected as President of Estonia by an electoral college on 23 September 2006 and his term as President began on 9 October 2006. He was reelected by Parliament in 2011.

Early life and education
Ilves was born in Stockholm, Sweden; his parents Endel Ilves (1923–1991) and Irene Ilves (née Rebane; 1925–2018) fled Estonia after its occupation by the Soviet Union during World War II. His maternal grandmother was a Russian from Saint Petersburg. He grew up in the United States in Leonia, New Jersey, and graduated from Leonia High School in 1972 as valedictorian. He received a bachelor's degree in psychology from Columbia University in 1976 and a master's degree in the same subject from the University of Pennsylvania in 1978. He also received an honorary degree from St. Olaf College in 2014 in recognition of his relationship with the college. In addition to Estonian, Ilves also speaks English, German, Latvian and Spanish. By Ilves's own admission, he speaks Estonian with a comparatively strong American accent, on account of spending his formative and young adult years in America and Germany.

Career

Ilves worked as a research assistant in Columbia University Department of Psychology from 1974 to 1979. From 1979 to 1981 he served as assistant director and English teacher at the Open Education Center in Englewood, New Jersey. Ilves then moved to Vancouver, British Columbia, Canada; from 1981 to 1983 he was director and administrator of arts at Vancouver Arts Centre and from 1983 to 1984 he taught Estonian literature and linguistics at Simon Fraser University.

From 1984 to 1993, Ilves worked in Munich, Germany as a journalist for Radio Free Europe, being the head of its Estonian desk since 1988. As Estonia had restored its independence in 1991, Ilves became Ambassador of Estonia to the United States in 1993, also serving as Ambassador to Canada and Mexico at the same time.

In December 1996, Ilves became Estonian Minister of Foreign Affairs, serving until he resigned in September 1998, when he became a member of a small opposition party (Peasants' Party, agrarian-conservative). Ilves was soon elected chairman of the People's Party (reformed Peasants' Party), which formed an electoral cartel with the Moderates, a centrist party. After the March 1999 parliamentary election he became foreign minister again, serving until 2002, when the so-called Triple Alliance collapsed. He supported Estonian membership in the European Union and succeeded in starting the negotiations which led to Estonia joining the European Union on 1 May 2004. From 2001 to 2002 he was the leader of the People's Party Moderates. He resigned from the position after the party's defeat in the October 2002 municipal elections, in which the party received only 4.4% of the total votes nationwide. In early 2004, the Moderates party renamed itself the Estonian Social Democratic Party.

In 2003, Ilves became an observer member of the European Parliament and, on 1 May 2004, a full member. In the 2004 elections to the European Parliament, Ilves was elected MEP in a landslide victory for the Estonian Social Democratic Party. He sat with the Party of European Socialists group in the Parliament. Katrin Saks took over his MEP seat when Ilves became President of Estonia in 2006. In 2011, he was re-elected for a second five-year term.

In 2013, it was announced that Ilves had accepted a position on the Council on CyberSecurity's Advisory Board. In 2015, it was announced that Ilves had agreed to join the group of advisers to the World Bank president Jim Yong Kim.

During his presidency, Ilves has been appointed to serve in several high positions in the field of ICT in the European Union. He served as chairman of the EU Task Force on eHealth from 2011 to 2012 and was chairman of the European Cloud Partnership Steering Board at the invitation of the European Commission from 2012 to 2014. In 2013 he chaired the High-Level Panel on Global Internet Cooperation and Governance Mechanisms convened by ICANN. From 2014 to 2015 Ilves was the co-chair of the advisory panel of the World Bank's World Development Report 2016 "Digital Dividends" and was also the chair of World Economic Forum's Global Agenda Council on Cyber Security beginning in June 2014.

Beginning in 2016, Ilves has been co-chairing The World Economic Forum working group The Global Futures Council on Blockchain Technology. In 2017 he joined Stanford University as a Bernard and Susan Liautaud Visiting Fellow at the Center for International Security and Cooperation in the Freeman Spogli Institute for International Studies. From July 2017, Ilves has been a Distinguished Visiting Fellow at the Hoover Institution, Stanford University.

Ilves belongs to the advisory council of the Alliance for Securing Democracy.

On 25 September 2020, Ilves was named as one of the 25 members of the "Real Facebook Oversight Board", an independent monitoring group unaffiliated with, but created in response to, the Oversight Board, Facebook Inc.'s content moderation review board.

Presidential elections

Ilves was nominated by the Reform Party, Union of Pro Patria and Res Publica and his own Social Democratic Party on 23 March 2006, as a candidate for the 2006 presidential election.

On 29 August, Ilves was the only candidate in the second and the third round of the presidential election in Riigikogu, the Parliament of Estonia (he was supported by an electoral coalition consisting of the governing Reform Party plus the Social Democrats and the Union of Pro Patria and Res Publica which form the parliamentary opposition). Ilves gathered 64 votes out of 65 ballots. Therefore, one deputy of the three party alliance supporting Ilves did not vote in favour of his candidacy. A two-thirds majority in the 101-seat Riigikogu was required, so he was not elected in Riigikogu. His candidacy was automatically transferred to the next round in the Electors' Assembly on 23 September.

On 13 September 2006, a broad spectrum of 80 well-known intellectuals published a declaration in support of Ilves' candidacy. Among those who signed were Neeme Järvi, Jaan Kross, Arvo Pärt and Jaan Kaplinski.

On 23 September 2006, he received 174 ballots in the first round of the presidential election in the Electors' Assembly, thus having been elected the next president of Estonia. His five-year term started on 9 October 2006.

On 29 August 2011, he was reelected by the 101-seat legislature to a second five-year term. His opponent was Indrek Tarand. He received support from 73 members of the legislature, and is the first candidate to be elected in the first round since Estonia regained independence in 1991.

Personal life
Ilves has been married three times. With his first wife, American psychologist Merry Bullock, he has two children: son Luukas Kristjan (b. 1987) and daughter Juulia Kristiine (b. 1992). In 2004, Ilves married his longtime partner Evelin Int with whom he has one daughter, Kadri Keiu (b. 2003). Ilves' representatives announced on 17 April that Ilves and Evelin Ilves had divorced as of 30 April 2015. In December 2015 it was announced that Ilves was engaged in mid-November to Ieva Kupce, the head of the Cybersecurity Division in the Defense Ministry of Latvia. They married on 2 January 2016. On 28 November 2016 they announced the birth of their son Hans Hendrik Ilves.

He maintains a Twitter account, personally posting on a regular basis to comment on both current events and his own interests, usually in English.

Ilves has a brother, Andres Ilves, formerly head of the Persian and Pashto World Service of the BBC. Until the early 2000s, Andres Ilves was head of the Afghanistan bureau of Radio Free Europe/Radio Liberty based in Prague, Czech Republic.

He is a member of the Estonian Students' Society.

Honours

National honours
  2006 The Collar of the Order of the Cross of Terra Mariana
  2008 The Collar of the Order of the National Coat of Arms, also known as the Presidential Chain

Foreign honours

  1999 Knight First Class of the Royal Norwegian Order of Merit
  1999 Grand Cross of the Order of Honour of Greece
  2001 Commander of the Légion d'Honneur of the French Republic
  2004 Third Class Order of the Seal of the Republic of Estonia
  2004 Three Star Order of the Republic of Latvia
  2006 Honorary Knight Grand Cross of the Order of the Bath of Great Britain
  2007 The Grand Cross of the Order of the White Rose of Finland with collar
  2007 The Grand Cordon of the Supreme Order of the Chrysanthemum of Japan
  2007 The Golden Fleece Order of Georgia
  2007 The Order of Isabella the Catholic with Collar of Spain
  2008 The Order of Vytautas the Great with the Golden Chain of Lithuania
  2008 The Knight Grand Cross of the Order of the Netherlands Lion
  2008 Grand Cordon of the Order of Leopold
  2009 The Chain of the Order of the Three Stars
  2009 The Grand Cross of the Order of Merit
  2010 St. George's Order of Victory
  2010 The Order of the Falcon, Knight Grand Cross
  2011 Royal Order of the Seraphim, Collar rank
  2011 Order of the Star of Romania, Collar rank
  2011 "Dostyk" (Friendship) the Star of Award I of Kazakhstan
  2012 The Grand Collar of the National Order of Merit of the Republic of Malta
  2012 The Cross of Recognition of Latvia, I class
  2014 Order of the White Eagle
  2014 The Grand Cross of the Royal Norwegian Order of St. Olav
  2015 Slovak Republic's Order of the White Double Cross, First Class

International awards and honorary degrees 
 2013 NDI Democracy Award by the National Democratic Institute
 2014 Freedom Award by the Atlantic Council
 2015 Aspen Prague Award by the Aspen Institute
 2016 Knight of Freedom Award by The Casimir Pulaski Foundation 
 2016 John Jay Award by Columbia College, Columbia University 
 2017 Reinhard Mohn Prize by the Bertelsmann Stiftung
 2017 World Leader in Cybersecurity Award by the Boston Global Forum
 2007 Honorary Doctorate of the Tbilisi State University, Georgia
 2010 Honorary Doctorate of the John Paul II Catholic University of Lublin, Poland
 2014 Doctor of Letters honoris causa of the St. Olaf College, United States of America

See also

 Legion of Honour
 List of Legion of Honour recipients by name (I)
 Legion of Honour Museum

References

External links 

 
 
 
 
 
 
 

|-

|-

|-

1953 births
Ambassadors of Estonia to Canada
American people of Estonian descent
Ambassadors of Estonia to Mexico
Ambassadors of Estonia to the United States
Columbia College (New York) alumni
Columbia University faculty
Estonian diplomats
Estonian journalists
Estonian people of Russian descent
Leonia High School alumni
Living people
Members of the Riigikogu, 1999–2003
MEPs for Estonia 2004–2009
Ministers of Foreign Affairs of Estonia
Leaders of political parties in Estonia
People from Leonia, New Jersey
Politicians from Stockholm
Former United States citizens
Presidents of Estonia
Social Democratic Party (Estonia) MEPs
Social Democratic Party (Estonia) politicians
University of Pennsylvania alumni
21st-century Estonian politicians

Collars of the Order of Isabella the Catholic
Commandeurs of the Légion d'honneur
Grand Crosses of the Order of Honour (Greece)
Grand Crosses of the Order of Merit of the Republic of Hungary (civil)
Grand Crosses with Golden Chain of the Order of Vytautas the Great
Honorary Knights Grand Cross of the Order of the Bath
Knights Grand Cross of the Order of the Falcon
Recipients of St. George's Order of Victory
Recipients of the Collar of the Order of the Cross of Terra Mariana
Recipients of the Order of the Golden Fleece (Georgia)
Recipients of the Order of the National Coat of Arms, 3rd Class
Recipients of the Cross of Recognition
First Class of the Order of the Star of Romania
Members of the Riigikogu, 2003–2007